Como is an unincorporated community in  Park County in the Rocky Mountains of central Colorado, United States. According to the 2010 census, the population of zip code 80432 is 439, including surrounding subdivisions in a 15 mile radius. Metropolitan Como proper usually has a population of 12 to 15 residents, within the Como plat.

History

It is believed the town was named by miners from Como, Italy, who worked the coal fields of the area. In 1879, the town became the location of a depot of the Denver, South Park and Pacific Railroad, which was extended over Kenosha Pass to reach the silver mining areas during the Colorado Silver Boom. Later, the town served as a division point for trains going northward over Boreas Pass and southward toward Garos and over Trout Creek Pass at the western end of South Park. The town has many historic weathered structures, including the roundhouse, hotel, and depot and has the air of a ghost town that is still nevertheless populated, by twenty people. It has a small commercial district consisting of a post office, gallery, hotel. The depot has been renovated with plans to make it an area tourist attraction.

Geography

Como is located at the northern end of South Park, Como is an historic railroad settlement. It sits approximately one-half mile (1 km) west of U.S. Route 285 and some nine miles (15 km) northeast of the county seat of Fairplay. Como is accessible by a paved County Road 33, which becomes gravel inside the town. Boreas Pass Road runs northwest over Boreas Pass to Breckenridge. The mountains northwest of Como form a dramatic background to the site of the town on the flank of Little Baldy Mountain.

Notable people

See also

 List of cities and towns in Colorado
 Front Range Urban Corridor

References

External links

Unincorporated communities in Park County, Colorado
Unincorporated communities in Colorado
Colorado Mining Boom